404 Long Range Patrol and Training Squadron is a long range patrol and training squadron in the Royal Canadian Air Force. The squadron was originally No. 404 Squadron of the Royal Canadian Air Force (RCAF) and later the Canadian Forces Air Command.

History

The squadron was formed at Thorney Island in Sussex, England on 15 April 1941 under Royal Air Force operational control. Tasked with coastal patrol and attack, the squadron flew the Bristol Blenheim Mk.IV & later the Beaufighter.  From May 1944 to September 1944 they were based at RAF Davidstow Moor in Cornwall, England.

As part of the RAF Dallachy strike wing of four Beaufighter-equipped squadrons, they took part in an attack on German ships on the Norwegian coast on 9 February 1945. The ships included a destroyer and "flak" ships as well as merchantmen. The ships were located in a fjord and German fighter aircraft scrambled in defence. As a result of the heavy losses to the Dallachy Wing the attack was subsequently called "Black Friday". The squadron disbanded on 25 May 1945.

The squadron was reformed on April 30, 1951, at RCAF Station Greenwood as 404 Maritime Reconnaissance Squadron. On 17 July 1956, 404 Squadron was redesignated as a Maritime Patrol squadron, and when the CP-140 Aurora came into service the title was changed again to 404 Maritime Patrol and Training Squadron. The current title is 404 Long Range Patrol and Training (LRP&T) Squadron.

Currently, 404 Sqn serves as the Operational Training Unit (OTU) for Aircrew and Maintenance personnel who work on the CP140 Aurora.

Aircraft operated
 Bristol Blenheim
 Bristol Beaufighter
 De Havilland Mosquito
 Avro Lancaster
 Beech Expeditor
 Lockheed Neptune
 Canadair Argus
 Lockheed CP-140 Aurora and CP-140A Arcturus (trainer for CP-140)

Notable personnel
Allan Bundy

External links

DND – History of 404 Squadron

Canadian Forces aircraft squadrons
Military units and formations established in 1941
Royal Canadian Air Force squadrons
RCAF training units